Austria is a destination and transit country for women, men, and children subjected to trafficking in persons, specifically forced prostitution and forced labor.

Victims originate from Eastern Europe, Africa, and Asia. Austrians reportedly spent $4.3 billion on domestic workers in 2009; exploitation is believed to be a significant problem in this sector. Some forced domestic servitude involves diplomats, primarily from the Middle East, who enjoy diplomatic immunity. Forced labor occurs in the agricultural, construction, restaurant, and tourism industries.

Forced begging involving Roma children and others from Eastern Europe continued to be a problem. An NGO which works primarily with Nigerian trafficking victims reported that traffickers abuse the legal prostitution and asylum processes to control their victims and keep them in Austria legally.

The Government of Austria fully complies with the minimum standards for the elimination of trafficking. The government identified and referred an increased number of trafficking victims for assistance, and police demonstrated an increasingly victim-centered approach to law enforcement efforts. In an attempt to prevent involuntary domestic servitude, the government amended its regulations in 2009 to require all foreign domestic workers to appear in person at the Ministry of Foreign Affairs to receive information on how to get help if they become victims of forced labor. It hosted a United Nations event to notify foreign embassies in Austria about this new requirement. The Austrian government, however, did not adequately punish convicted trafficking offenders, and it did not employ systematic procedures for the identification and referral of victims. Also, some child victims of trafficking were penalized for unlawful acts committed as a direct result of being trafficked. U.S. State Department's Office to Monitor and Combat Trafficking in Persons placed the country in "Tier 1"  in 2017.

Prosecution
The Austrian government demonstrated moderate efforts to prosecute and convict traffickers during the reporting period. However, over half of convicted traffickers spent 12 months or less in jail; one-third of convicted traffickers received no jail time.

Article 104(a) of the Austrian Criminal Code prohibits trafficking for both sexual exploitation and forced labor. Prosecutors typically use Articles 104(a) and 217 of the Criminal Code, which prohibit cross border trafficking for the purpose of prostitution, as well as Article 114 of the Aliens Police Act, which contains provisions on alien smuggling, to prosecute traffickers. Penalties prescribed in Article 104(a) and Article 114 range up to 10 years' imprisonment, while penalties prescribed in Article 217 range from six months' to 10 years' imprisonment. These penalties are sufficiently stringent and commensurate with those prescribed for other serious crimes, such as rape.

The government reportedly prosecuted and convicted 1 trafficking offenders in 2008; however, it only reported sentences for offenders in which trafficking was the leading charge. In 2008, the government convicted 18 trafficking offenders, a decrease from 30 such convictions in 2007. Sentences for three of these offenders were between one and three years. The government completely suspended the sentences of four offenders and partially suspended nine, resulting in sentences between one and 12 months in jail. Two other convicted traffickers paid fines. Local observers report a lack of anti-trafficking expertise among prosecutors and judges. According to one NGO, during a case in 2009, a victim testified five separate times, but the suspect was subsequently released. The Austrian government did not disaggregate its data to demonstrate it prosecuted or convicted labor trafficking offenders.

Protection
The Government of Austria sustained its efforts to protect identified victims of human trafficking during the reporting period. The government did not yet, however, employ formal and systematic procedures for the identification and referral of victims within labor or legal and illegal prostitution sectors.

Police in Vienna proactively referred trafficking victims for care and collaborated with NGOs to improve their ability to spot indicators of sex trafficking, but referral was ad hoc and reliant on certain victim-sensitive officers. NGOs reported police effectively partnered with them on cases to ensure trafficking victims adequate recovery time to become more effective witnesses. It continued to fund the country's only specialized anti-trafficking NGO, which provided open shelter and assistance to female victims in Vienna. This shelter was at its full capacity of 18 beds throughout 2009. The Austrian government provided $828,000 to this NGO in 2009, compared with $542,700 in 2008. It provided counseling and other services to 182 trafficking victims in 2009; police referred approximately 90 of these victims, compared with 60 referrals from the previous year. Fifty-nine victims received shelter from the government-funded NGO; all victims received assistance in the form of social and legal counseling in their native language, German-language classes, computer courses, and health prevention.

The government provided foreign victims of trafficking with legal alternatives to their removal, and in April 2009 passed the Residence and Settlement Act, which listed victims of trafficking as a special category with a right for temporary resident status. The government encouraged victims to assist with investigations and prosecutions of traffickers and an NGO reported a high rate of victims who willingly cooperated on their cases. Furthermore, police provided information on potential female victims of forced prostitution to NGOs when these victims appeared reluctant to disclose elements of their exploitation to law enforcement. According to one NGO, the only systematic regulation by the government within Austria's sizable, legal commercial sex sector consisted of weekly health checks for sexually transmitted diseases and periodic police checks of registration cards. In 2009, the government began training labor inspectors to increase identification of forced labor trafficking.

The City of Vienna's specialist center for unaccompanied minors accommodated 121 children in 2009, some of whom were reported to be victims of trafficking. This center reportedly facilitated the repatriation of children subjected to forced prostitution and forced begging during the reporting period. However, according to local observers, this center has limited capacity to accommodate trafficked children, does not function as an anti-trafficking NGO, and there was little official follow-up or assurances made to ensure a safe return or protection from re-trafficking. Furthermore, the center only accommodated children who had been apprehended by the police, and is an open facility, allowing traffickers continued access to their victims.

According to local experts, authorities, especially outside Vienna, do not identify many child trafficking victims and there are no specialized services or targeted outreach efforts to identify potential children who are trafficked throughout Austria. The government reportedly ensured identified victims were not punished for unlawful acts committed as a direct result of being trafficked; however, during the year at least some child sex trafficking victims were penalized for unlawfully engaging in prostitution.

Prevention
Austria continues its proactive efforts to prevent trafficking by conducting public awareness activities. It continues to subsidize television programs about trafficking and hosts international conferences aimed at raising awareness about human trafficking. It also funds campaigns to educate people about the possible presence of trafficked women in the prostitution sector and to inform female prostitutes about their rights under national law by distributing brochures and continues to maintain an active presence in well known "red light districts".

Likewise, the Interior Ministry produced and distributed literature that could increase law enforcement's awareness about human trafficking and improve victim identification processes. The brochure lists contact numbers of anti-trafficking NGOs and government offices responsible for victim protection. The government also subsidized the production and distribution of leaflets containing information that offers support to victims. According to ECPAT Austria, approximately 4,500 Austrians contribute to the global demand for child sex tourism. Austrian law provided extraterritorial jurisdiction over Austrian nationals who travel abroad to engage in child commercial sexual exploitation.

The above initiatives are aligned with the adopted strategy that involve the "coordination of all activities concerned at the regional, national and international level by raising awareness, the protection of victims by establishing victims' rights," and "the prosecution of offenders of THB." Austria is a signatory to a number of international conventions addressing human trafficking such as the United Nations Convention Against Transnational Organized Crime (2000) and its Protocol to Prevent, Suppress, and Punish Trafficking in Persons, Especially Women and Children; the Council of Europe Convention on Action against Trafficking in Human Beings(2005); the UN Convention on the Rights of the Child (1989) and the Optional Protocol on the Sale of Children, Child Prostitution and Child Pornography(2000); and the UN Convention on the Elimination of All Forms of Discrimination against Women.

In 2004, the Austrian government also created the Task Force on Combating Human Trafficking under the direction of the Foreign Ministry and was tasked to elaborate and monitor the implementation of the National Action Plans on Combating Human Trafficking. This national plan underwent a series of changes in 2009 and 2012. 

There are observers who argue that Austria should adopt specific measures to enforce compliance to the principle of non-punishment of human trafficking victims. The argument is that the criminalization of victims of trafficking discourages victims from coming forward and cooperating with authorities. Recently, Austria started granting residence permits to victims under its "red-white-red card" immigrant program to address the security issue for those cooperating with authorities.

See also
Human rights in Austria

References

 
Human rights abuses in Austria